André Tabet (1902–1981) was a French Algerian screenwriter.  He was the elder brother of Georges Tabet.

Selected filmography
 That's Not the Way to Die (1946)
 The Unknown Singer (1947)
 Destiny Has Fun (1947)
 Counter Investigation (1947)
 Fandango (1949)
 The Heroic Monsieur Boniface (1949)
 Gunman in the Streets (1950)
 Rendezvous in Grenada (1951)
 My Wife, My Cow and Me (1952)
 Daughters of Destiny (1954)
 Mata Hari's Daughter (1954)
 Dangerous Turning (1954)
 Stain in the Snow (1954)
 Ali Baba and the Forty Thieves (1954)
 The Price of Love (1955)
 The Road to Paradise (1956)
 Women's Prison (1958)
 The Violet Seller (1958)
 The Night They Killed Rasputin (1960)
 Son of the Circus (1963)
 Les Yeux cernés (1964)
 Une ravissante idiote (1964)
 The Vampire of Düsseldorf (1965)
 La Grande Vadrouille (1966)
 The Oldest Profession (1967)
 The Heist (1970)

References

Bibliography
 Hardy, Phil. The BFI Companion to Crime. A&C Black, 1997.ess, 1989.
 Hayward, Susan. Simone Signoret: The Star as Cultural Sign. Continuum, 2004.

External links

1902 births
1981 deaths
Algerian screenwriters
French screenwriters
People from Algiers
Pieds-Noirs
Migrants from French Algeria to France